Typhoon Chebi, known in the Philippines as Typhoon Queenie, was a powerful typhoon that impacted Luzon during November 2006. Chebi is the third typhoon since Typhoon Xangsane to hit the country destructively. The 30th tropical depression developed east of the Mariana Islands on October 31 as a weak disturbance. The system was dubbed into a tropical depression on November 8, until both the JMA and PAGASA upgraded it to a tropical storm on November 9. Chebi rapidly intensified to a Category 4 typhoon the next day and made landfall over northern Philippines on November 11. The system finally dissipated near Hong Kong and Vietnam on November 14.

The name Chebi is a misspelling for Jebi and was corrected in 2007, which means swallow in Korean.

Meteorological history

Preparations and impact

Philippines

Typhoon Chebi entered the Philippine Area of Responsibility (PAR) on November 10 and was named Queenie by PAGASA. On November 11, just after its peak intensity, Chebi made landfall over Aurora, Philippines near Casiguran. Public Storm Warning Signal #2, meaning winds extending from 60 to 100 kp/h, is up over southern Isabela, Quirino, Aurora, northern Quezon and Polillo Island. Cagayan, Isabela, Ifugao, Nueva Vizcaya, Bulacan, Quezon, Camarines provinces and Catanduanes have been placed under Signal #1. On November 13, Chebi exited the PAR with both the PAGASA and NDRRMC stopped warning on the system. The PNRC is also preparing relief supplies to be distributed to families in the barangays of Dibulo and Digomased where an estimated 300 families have been evacuated within the Municipality of Dinapegue. However, initial actions have included the establishment of a tent camp in the city of Calamba, one hour south of Manila, set up in three days from November 8 to 11 to accommodate 87 families. The camp's capacity is 300 families. The ICRC provided two emergency water storage bladders, one for 10,000 litres and one for 5,000 litres. The camp is managed by the city administration, which is finishing constructions of latrines, showers, cooking and laundry facilities. About 8,300 people who evacuated flooded villages in San Jose have returned home, the civil defense office said.

All told, the typhoon caused further casualties as well as damage caused by the earlier Typhoon Cimaron. Landslides, overflowing rivers, toppled trees and power lines blocked several roads to Casiguran and Dinapigue town in nearby Isabela province. Strong winds destroyed two houses and damaged a dozen others in Casiguran. The OCD said most of the floodwaters in the area have receded by early of November 12, but some rice crops were damaged in San Jose city in Nueva Ecija province where some farms were submerged under about 1.2 meters (four feet) of water. A total of 1,676 houses were damaged in Dipaculao, Casiguran and Dinalungan, Aurora Province. In Aurora Province, it caused floods, cutting the province's road system, as well as zero visibility, further isolating it from relief efforts. Initial assessments from chapters in Aurora, Isabela and Nueva Ecija say 4,624 families have had their homes destroyed or damaged. There have also been reports of
power outages and roads once again being cut off. A total of 3,958 families or 21,250 persons were affected in 38 barangays of 7 municipalities and 1 city in the provinces of Isabela, Aurora and Nueva Ecija. There were 10 persons reported injured in Casiguran, Aurora. One person was reported dead in San Jose City, Nueva Ecija with five missing in Sabang, Baler, Aurora.

Vietnam
Meteorologists predicted the typhoon would start building up and heading directly west across the Eastern Sea by evening of November 12. Chebi was located several kilometers east of Luzon in the Philippines and was reportedly generating Category 14 to 15 winds (150–183 km/h) around the center. On November 13, at that stage the Central Hydro-Meteorological Center predicted the storm would steer west-northwest at 10–15 km/h and bring winds gusting up to 150 km/h. If the meteorologists have got it right in their latest prediction, the eighth storm to set its sights on Viet Nam this year should begin weakening in the next 24 hours. Chebi had weakened into a tropical depression on November 14 and was no longer threatened the central region, Vietnam's National Hydrometeorological Forecast Center said. Even so, Vietnam's eighth storm of the year, Chebi, was strong enough to produce waves as high as four meters around the Hoang Sa Islands in the Eastern Sea.

See also

 Other typhoons that impacted the Philippines in 2006:
 Typhoon Chanchu
 Typhoon Xangsane
 Typhoon Cimaron
 Typhoon Durian
 Typhoon Utor
 Typhoon Elsie (1989) - Had a similar track, though had a stronger impact
 Typhoon Nalgae (2011) - Had a similar track and intensity, also affected Hong Kong

References

External links

 JMA General Information of Typhoon Cimaron (0620) from Digital Typhoon
 JMA Best Track Data of Typhoon Cimaron (0620) 
 JMA Best Track Data (Graphics) of Typhoon Cimaron (0620)

 JTWC Best Track Data of Typhoon 23W (Chebi)
 23W.CHEBI from the U.S. Naval Research Laboratory

Chebi
2006 in Vietnam
Cimaron
Chebi
Typhoons in the Philippines
Chebi
Chebi